Jason Lauzon-Séguin (born November 27, 1990) is a former Canadian football offensive lineman. He played CIS football with the Laval Rouge et Or.

Professional career

Ottawa Redblacks
Lauzon-Séguin was drafted by the Ottawa Redblacks with the seventh overall pick in the 2016 CFL Draft. He dressed for his first professional regular season game on June 25, 2016 against the Edmonton Eskimos and played in 14 regular season games in his rookie year. He also played in the Redblacks' 104th Grey Cup championship win that year over the Calgary Stampeders. In total, Lauzon-Séguin played in four seasons for Ottawa, dressing in 54 regular season games and two Grey Cups. He did not play in 2020 due to the cancellation of the 2020 CFL season. He became a free agent in 2021.

Montreal Alouettes
On February 10, 2021, it was announced that Lauzon-Séguin had signed with the Montreal Alouettes. He was placed on the suspended list on July 6, 2021, and retired from professional football on July 11.

References

External links
Montreal Alouettes bio

Living people
1991 births
Players of Canadian football from Quebec
Canadian football offensive linemen
Laval Rouge et Or football players
Montreal Alouettes players
Ottawa Redblacks players
People from Pointe-Claire
Canadian Football League Rookie of the Year Award winners